Mukerjea is an Indian surname. Notable people with the surname include:

 Indrani Mukerjea (born 1972), Indian HR consultant and media executive
 Jaidip Mukerjea (born 1942), Indian tennis player
 Peter Mukerjea (born 1954), Indian television executive, husband of Indrani

Indian surnames